Brett Heady (born 4 January 1970) is a former Australian rules footballer who played with West Coast in the AFL from 1990 to 1999. He was named in West Coast's 'Team of the Decade' as a half forward.

Heady was a handy wing/half-forward player who was an opportunist when it came to scoring goals.

Heady played an important role in 1994, figuring heavily in the finals, kicking six against Melbourne in the preliminary final and then two in the Grand Final a week after, earning Heady his second AFL premiership medallion.

In 1999, Heady succumbed to his injuries and announced his retirement from the AFL, at the age of 29 after 156 games for the Eagles.

Statistics

|-
|- style="background-color: #EAEAEA"
! scope="row" style="text-align:center" | 1990
|style="text-align:center;"|
| 39 || 20 || 24 || 16 || 285 || 89 || 374 || 94 || 19 || 1.2 || 0.8 || 14.3 || 4.5 || 18.7 || 4.7 || 1.0 || 6
|-
! scope="row" style="text-align:center" | 1991
|style="text-align:center;"|
| 1 || 26 || 47 || 36 || 350 || 100 || 450 || 149 || 22 || 1.8 || 1.4 || 13.5 || 3.8 || 17.3 || 5.7 || 0.8 || 6
|- style="background-color: #EAEAEA"
|style="text-align:center;background:#afe6ba;"|1992†
|style="text-align:center;"|
| 1 || 11 || 20 || 17 || 122 || 42 || 164 || 50 || 10 || 1.8 || 1.5 || 11.1 || 3.8 || 14.9 || 4.5 || 0.9 || 1
|-
! scope="row" style="text-align:center" | 1993
|style="text-align:center;"|
| 1 || 19 || 24 || 19 || 204 || 78 || 282 || 86 || 13 || 1.3 || 1.0 || 10.7 || 4.1 || 14.8 || 4.5 || 0.7 || 1
|- style="background-color: #EAEAEA"
|style="text-align:center;background:#afe6ba;"|1994†
|style="text-align:center;"|
| 1 || 21 || 44 || 27 || 164 || 69 || 233 || 68 || 13 || 2.1 || 1.3 || 7.8 || 3.3 || 11.1 || 3.2 || 0.6 || 0
|-
! scope="row" style="text-align:center" | 1995
|style="text-align:center;"|
| 1 || 15 || 30 || 16 || 117 || 43 || 160 || 62 || 16 || 2.0 || 1.1 || 7.8 || 2.9 || 10.7 || 4.1 || 1.1 || 4
|- style="background-color: #EAEAEA"
! scope="row" style="text-align:center" | 1996
|style="text-align:center;"|
| 1 || 7 || 4 || 1 || 70 || 39 || 109 || 25 || 7 || 0.6 || 0.1 || 10.0 || 5.6 || 15.6 || 3.6 || 1.0 || 0
|-
! scope="row" style="text-align:center" | 1997
|style="text-align:center;"|
| 1 || 21 || 23 || 14 || 258 || 112 || 370 || 104 || 23 || 1.1 || 0.7 || 12.3 || 5.3 || 17.6 || 5.0 || 1.1 || 3
|- style="background-color: #EAEAEA"
! scope="row" style="text-align:center" | 1998
|style="text-align:center;"|
| 1 || 15 || 21 || 15 || 136 || 52 || 188 || 52 || 26 || 1.4 || 1.0 || 9.1 || 3.5 || 12.5 || 3.5 || 1.7 || 0
|-
! scope="row" style="text-align:center" | 1999
|style="text-align:center;"|
| 1 || 1 || 0 || 0 || 0 || 1 || 1 || 0 || 0 || 0.0 || 0.0 || 0.0 || 1.0 || 1.0 || 0.0 || 0.0 || 0
|- class="sortbottom"
! colspan=3| Career
! 156
! 237
! 161
! 1706
! 625
! 2331
! 690
! 149
! 1.5
! 1.0
! 10.9
! 4.0
! 14.9
! 4.4
! 1.0
! 21
|}

References

External links

1970 births
Living people
Australian rules footballers from Western Australia
West Coast Eagles players
West Coast Eagles Premiership players
Subiaco Football Club players
Western Australian State of Origin players
Two-time VFL/AFL Premiership players